Wyndham is a small village in the County Borough of Bridgend, Wales built alongside the Ogwr Fawr tributary of the River Ogmore. The village is part of the community of the Ogmore Valley and is south of Nantymoel and north west of Ogmore Vale. The village grew out of the industrialisation of the valley in the 19th century, when coal mines were sunk in the area. The village is also nearby the local industrial estate Penllwyngwent in Ogmore Vale. Wyndham also has a convenience store called "Patel's Minimarket" which is a small minimarket near the main road. Opposite the convenience store is a youth club called the "Wyndham Boys and Girls Club" which has been open for nearly 80 years. At the end of Wyndham, there is a pub called the "Wyndham Arms". Nearby, between Wyndham and Ogmore Vale, there is a Primary School called Ogmore Vale Primary School. In Wyndham, there is a Christian Church which is called St David's Church owned by Father Julien. Wyndham has access to a cycle track. Wyndham has panoramic views of the Bwlch. It has easy access the A4061. The party Labour has held Wyndham for many years and is now led by the leader Huw Irranca-Davies

References

Villages in Bridgend County Borough